The 1985 Appalachian State Mountaineers football team was an American football team that represented Appalachian State University as a member of the Southern Conference (SoCon) during the 1985 NCAA Division I-AA football season. In their second year under head coach Sparky Woods, the Mountaineers compiled an overall record of 8–3 with a mark of 6–1 in conference play, placing second in the SoCon.

Schedule

References

Appalachian State
Appalachian State Mountaineers football seasons
Appalachian State Mountaineers football